Joseph P. Murphy was a member of the Wisconsin State Assembly.

Biography
Murphy was born on April 1, 1899, in Milwaukee, Wisconsin. During World War I, he served in the United States Army.

Political career
Murphy was a member of the Assembly from 1951 to 1958 as a member of the Democratic Party. He was an unsuccessful candidate for re-election in 1958 as an Independent.

References

Politicians from Milwaukee
Military personnel from Milwaukee
United States Army soldiers
United States Army personnel of World War I
1899 births
Year of death missing
Democratic Party members of the Wisconsin State Assembly